KMTZ (107.7 FM) is a radio station in Butte, Montana. Owned by Townsquare Media, it broadcasts a variety hits format branded as "107.7 Dave FM".

The station was assigned the KMTZ call letters by the Federal Communications Commission on June 1, 2006.

On April 5, 2017, Montana Radio Company announced that it would sell KMTZ to Cherry Creek Radio. Following the completion of the sale on July 28, 2017, the previously-silent station went on the air as 107.7 Dave FM.

References

External links

MTZ
Gallatin County, Montana
Radio stations established in 2010
2010 establishments in Montana
Townsquare Media radio stations